62–72 Tay Street (also known as the County Buildings) is an historic row of buildings in Perth, Scotland. Designed by local architect John Young, the building is Category B listed, dating to 1881. Standing on Tay Street, the building was originally the home of the Perthshire Society of Natural Science Museum, constructed in memory of Sir Thomas Moncreiffe, 7th Baronet, a past president of the society. The museum housed two exhibits: a local (or regional) collection (which contained a collection of the animals, plants and rocks to be found in Perthshire and the basin of the Tay) and The Type (or Index) Museum, which illustrated the main types of animals, plants and rocks.

The museum was extended in 1895 by John Young's son, George Penrose Kennedy Young.

In 1902, the museum and its collection were given to the town council. The museum closed in 1934, and its artefacts moved to Perth Museum and Art Gallery on nearby George Street.

The building subsequently became a Masonic hall. A Masonic insignia is carved into the doorpiece.

The northern end of the building (number 68–72) were destroyed by a fire in 1987.

Number 63 is the home of restaurant 63 Tay Street.

Rebuilding

See also
List of listed buildings in Perth, Scotland

References

1881 establishments in Scotland
Tay Street, 62-72
Category B listed buildings in Perth and Kinross